Kitsch is a semesterly magazine produced by students of Cornell University. It prints feature journalism, fiction, opinions, art, and miscellaneous shorter pieces; one of its taglines reads: "Where fact and fiction meet." The relatively unrestricted scope of the publication ensures that any thought-provoking topic may be considered for a feature.

History

Founding 
Kitsch was founded in January 2003 by two then-freshmen at Cornell, Katie Jentleson and Samantha Henig. Jentleson and Henig had both been highly involved in feature journalism at Montgomery Blair High School in Silver Spring, Maryland. Upon arriving at Cornell in the fall of 2002, they found themselves underwhelmed at the university's journalism scene, which consisted mainly of The Cornell Daily Sun and a large number of poetry magazines. Jentleson and Henig perceived a need for a publication "falling on the line between [them]." In the second semester of their freshman year, they established Kitsch to fill this gap, and published the first issue for release on Cornell's campus in the spring of 2003. It featured a mix of articles about life on campus, life off-campus, and entertainment, as well as a collection of fiction, art, and photography. Similarly-structured issues were produced during each of the next four semesters.

In the fall of 2005, Jentleson and Henig became concerned about the future of the publication. Both founders were to graduate from Cornell and had no clear successors to keep the publication active. A strong recruitment effort during the fall semester of 2005 yielded over a dozen new members to the staff of Kitsch, primarily from the class of 2009, ensuring the survival of the publication. After Jentleson and Henig graduated, the position of co-editors-in-chief was passed to Robert Ochshorn and D. Evan Mulvihill, both class of 2009. Notably, Ochshorn, as the former editor-in-chief of the Ithaca High School Tattler, had been a central figure in that publication's 2005 controversy, in which a group of students sued the Ithaca City School District, alleging unconstitutional censorship of the Tattler.

Development and expansion
Three major changes to the magazine were announced for the fall semester of 2007. First, the magazine began to sell advertisements for local businesses. Second, the staff reached out to interested students at Ithaca College and worked to make Kitsch a production of both institutions. Third, the internal editorial structure of the magazine was overhauled, replacing the loose and centralized system of editing helmed by Jentleson and Henig with one organized into sections according to topic, with individual sub-editors for each. These sections include:
Bite Size (the introductory pages, a mix of short and often playful recurring features)
Zooming In (matters pertaining to campus-life at either college, or to issues affecting the town of Ithaca, New York)
Zooming Out (life outside Ithaca)
Watch & Listen (entertainment and pop culture)
Fiction
Students were also recruited into new positions in advertising, business, distribution, and coordination with the Ithaca College group. Ochshorn and Mulvihill retained their positions as co-editors-in-chief for Fall 2007, but Mulvihill left the position in the spring of 2008 in order to spearhead the effort to launch a set of new online blogs for Kitsch (see external links).

The intention at the beginning of 2007–08 was to produce four issues over the course of the school-year instead of two. Enthusiasm was high, and the first issue was produced in half the usual amount of time; however, the second issue took much longer to compile. Furthermore, in the spring, Kitsch abruptly ran out of money, leading to a number of fundraising efforts (e.g. a bake-sale). The final issue was finally produced and released at the end of the summer of 2008, and Peter Fritch was inducted as the general editor for 2008–09.

Funding controversy of 2009
As in the year before, Kitsch encountered funding difficulties in the spring of 2009, but this time in the form of a suspension of funding from Cornell's Student Activities Funding Commission when Kitsch′s Cornell editorial board made a technical error during the funding pre-application process. Despite the fact that the error was caught before the deadline for the main funding application, Kitsch was denied the opportunity to correct its error or apply for funding. The SAFC declared that nothing could be done to give Kitsch any money that semester. Funds from Ithaca College, advertising, subscriptions, and other Cornell sources (most importantly, the Department of History and the Cornell Council for the Arts) enabled Kitsch to print one issue in the spring semester, but not two as originally planned. Fritch would later call the actions of the SAFC "disproportionate… absurd and unfair".

Issue production cycle
The process by which an issue of Kitsch is compiled is fairly organic and informal. Aspiring writers (either with ideas in hand or not) attend group meetings to share and exchange story ideas. From the pool of possible feature topics thus generated, writers claim ideas to work on and produce a rough draft. These drafts are edited by the sub-editor whose section corresponds best to the topic, and is then returned to the writer to be further worked on. In the meantime, at least one artist is assigned to illustrate each article. When the editor is satisfied with a draft, it is submitted to the copy-editors and layout staff, who check over the articles and design the page layouts of each article and its illustrations. Submissions of art and fiction are processed in a similar way for inclusion in the final product.

As issues begin to take shape, the editorial staff often inspects the completed stories and features for commonalities. When a common thread exists among several submissions, the design and layout of the issue may be stylized around that central theme. Past themes have included the "Exposure" issue (Spring 2005), the "Romance" issue (Fall 2008), the "War" issue (Summer 2008), and the "Exploitation" issue (Spring 2009). It is important to note, however, that these themes do not dictate in advance the sorts of stories selected for inclusion in a given issue—rather, the theme is determined only in retrospect.

References

External links
 Kitsch Website
 Kitsch Blogs
 Student Organization Information page for Kitsch Magazine at Cornell University

2003 establishments in New York (state)
Biannual magazines published in the United States
Student magazines published in the United States
Triannual magazines published in the United States
Cornell University publications
Ithaca College student groups
Magazines established in 2003
Magazines published in New York (state)